Pimsiri Sirikaew (born April 25, 1990) is a Thai weightlifter.  She is a two-time Olympic silver medalist in the women's 58 kg division.

References

1990 births
Living people
Pimsiri Sirikaew
Pimsiri Sirikaew
Weightlifters at the 2012 Summer Olympics
Weightlifters at the 2016 Summer Olympics
Pimsiri Sirikaew
Olympic medalists in weightlifting
Weightlifters at the 2010 Asian Games
World Weightlifting Championships medalists
Medalists at the 2012 Summer Olympics
Medalists at the 2016 Summer Olympics
Weightlifters at the 2014 Asian Games
Pimsiri Sirikaew
Universiade medalists in weightlifting
Pimsiri Sirikaew
Pimsiri Sirikaew
Southeast Asian Games medalists in weightlifting
Competitors at the 2009 Southeast Asian Games
Universiade bronze medalists for Thailand
Pimsiri Sirikaew
Medalists at the 2013 Summer Universiade
Pimsiri Sirikaew